Cicindela elisae is a species of ground beetles native to Asia.

External links
This article incorporates information from the Norwegian Wikipedia.

elisae
Beetles described in 1859